Openbravo is a Spanish cloud-based software provider specializing in retail and restaurants; formerly known as a horizontal open-source ERP software vendor for different industries. The head office of Openbravo is located in Pamplona, Spain. Openbravo also has offices in Barcelona and Lille. The company's main product is Openbravo Commerce Cloud, a cloud-based omnichannel platform.

History 
Openbravo's roots are in the development of business administration software, first developed by two employees of the University of Navarra, Nicolas Serrano and Ismael Ciordia. They were both involved in the mid-1990s in developing the management of the university. They used emerging internet technologies while doing their work, and subsequently introduced a new approach for web applications. Their concept was realized in a new company called Tecnicia, founded in August 2001 by Serrano, Ciordia, and Aguinaga. In 2005, two management consultants, Manel Sarasa and Josep Mitjá, were asked by a venture capital company to evaluate Tecnicia and prepare a business plan for its evolution. In 2006, the two consultants joined Tecnicia as the CEO and COO, respectively. Around the same time the Spanish investment company Sodena invested US$6.4 million in the further development of the company.

In 2006 the company was renamed Openbravo and the first product launched was Openbravo ERP. The code was open-sourced in April that same year. In 2007, the company announced the acquisition of LibrePOS, a Java-based Point-of-Sale (POS) application for the retail and hospitality businesses. LibrePOS was rebranded as Openbravo POS (or Openbravo Java POS). In May 2008 Openbravo attracted three more investors, Amadeus (UK), GIMV (Belgium) and Adara (Spain) for a second investment round totalling $12.5 million. This investment launched Openbravo as one of the leading open source companies with substantial resources to further develop its products and services.

In July 2012 Openbravo launched Openbravo for Retail, a vertical solution for the Retail industry including the Openbravo Web POS, a new POS solution that replaced the previous Openbravo Java POS. Openbravo Web POS is a web, mobile and responsive POS solution.

In March 2014, Openbravo ERP was renamed Openbravo ERP Platform. Openbravo for Retail was renamed to Openbravo Commerce Platform.

In May 2015, the Openbravo Commerce Platform and Openbravo ERP Platform were renamed to Openbravo Commerce Suite and Openbravo Business Suite. Openbravo announces its strategic focus in Retail. Openbravo also launches the Openbravo Subscription Management and Recurring Billing, a specialized solution for recurring transactions-based revenue models.

In February 2016, Openbravo launches Openbravo Cloud, its official cloud offering, and starts the distribution of Openbravo Commerce Cloud, a cloud-based and mobile-enabled omnichannel platform for midsize to large retail and restaurant chains.

In 2018, Openbravo announces a certified SAP connector to facilitate the integration of the Openbravo Commerce Cloud in all those clients running SAP as their central corporate system.

Business and markets
Openbravo targets today mid-sized to large retail and restaurant chains seeking a new cloud-based platform to support their omnichannel operations. Typically with a physical network of 15/20 locations and more and running omnichannel operations.

Current products 
Openbravo currently distributes Openbravo Commerce Cloud, a mobile and cloud omnichannel platform targeting retail and restaurant chains to support its omnichannel operations. The functionality offered by the platform covers both front and back office processes for the integration of all sales channels. Features such as a web and mobile point of sale, an integrated OMS engine, CRM & Clienteling functionalities or mobile warehouse and inventory management among others.

The Openbravo platform is distributed under an annual subscription model, based mainly on the number of concurrent back office users and the number of points of sale (POS) subscribed. Additional costs may exist for subscriptions to additional commercial functionality as connectors with external systems.

Previous products (discontinued) 
Since its appearance in the market in 2006, Openbravo has launched different products that help to describe the evolution of the company. The following information is shown for historical purposes only, since all these products are no longer offered.

Openbravo ERP 
Openbravo ERP was the first product launched by Openbravo. It was a web-based Enterprise Resource Planning software for small and medium-sized companies that is released under the Openbravo Public License, based on the Mozilla Public License. The model for the program was originally based on the Compiere ERP program that is also open-source, released under the GNU General Public License version 2.  As of January 2008, the program was among the top ten most active projects of SourceForge.

With Openbravo ERP organizations can automate and register the most common business processes, in the fields: Sales, Procurement, Manufacturing, Projects, Finance, MRP and more.  Numerous commercial extensions are available on the Openbravo Exchange which can be procured by users with a commercial edition of Openbravo ERP. This paid-for version offers additional functionality compared to the free Community Edition, among them integrated administration tools, a non-technical tool for updates and upgrades, access to Openbravo Exchange and a Service Level Agreement. The characteristic of the Openbravo ERP application is the green web interface through which users maintain company data in a web browser. Openbravo can also create and export reports and data to several formats, such as PDF and Microsoft Excel.

Openbravo's Java-based architecture focuses on two development models:
 model-driven development, in which developers describe the application in terms of models rather than code
 model-view-controller, a well-established design pattern in which the presentation logic and the business logic are kept isolated

These two models allow for integration with other programs and for a simple interface. The application of open standards Openbravo ERP can be integrated with other open source applications like Magento webshop, Pentaho Business Intelligence, ProcessMaker BPM, Liferay Portal and SugarCRM.

In March 2014, Openbravo ERP was renamed to Openbravo ERP Platform, which was changed again to Openbravo Business Suite in May 2015. The latest version is 3.0.36902 released in April 2020.

Openbravo Java POS 

Openbravo POS was the first POS solution offered by Openbravo. It is a Java Point-of-Sale (POS) application for retail and hospitality businesses. The application came into existence called TinaPOS. For legal reasons the application was renamed to LibrePOS.  In 2007 LibrePOS was acquired by Openbravo and it is known by its current name.  The program was completely integrated into Openbravo ERP. Through this integration it was possible to update stock levels, financial journals and customer data directly in the central database when a POS sales is executed in the stores. Openbravo POS can be applied using PDAs for order intake.
In July 2012 Openbravo launched its new POS solution, the Openbravo Web POS, included in the Openbravo Commerce Suite and which replaced the Openbravo Java POS. Openbravo Java POS has been discontinued.

Openbravo Business Suite 
The Openbravo Business Suite was launched in May 2015, replacing the previous Openbravo ERP Platform. It is a global management solution built on top of the Openbravo Technology Platform including horizontal ERP, CRM and BI functionality for across industries.

Openbravo Commerce Suite 
The Openbravo Commerce Suite is the Openbravo's solution for retailers. It is a multi-channel retail management solution including a responsive web and mobile POS (Openbravo Web POS) backed by a comprehensive functionality for Merchandise Management, Supply Chain Management and Enterprise Management.

Openbravo Subscription Management and Recurring Billing 
A commercial solution for companies with recurring billing revenue models, including functionality from pricing definition to automatic revenue recognition and accounting.

Openbravo Commerce Cloud 
The current version of the Openbravo software provides a cloud-based and mobile-enabled omnichannel platform for midsize to large specialty retailers and restaurant chains. It is composed by: Openbravo Commerce Central, Openbravo Store, Openbravo OMS, Openbravo WMS and Openbravo Reporting.

See also 
Omnichannel
Cloud computing
Retail
Point of Sale
OMS
List of free and open source software packages

References 

Business software companies
Point of sale companies
Retail point of sale systems
Cloud computing providers
Development software companies
Supply chain software companies
Companies based in Navarre
Software companies of Spain